The 1982–83 Liga Leumit season saw Maccabi Netanya win the title, with the club's Oded Machnes finishing as the league's top scorer with 22 goals. Hapoel Ramat Gan, Hapoel Jerusalem and Hapoel Kfar Saba (who finished bottom of the league a year after winning the title) were relegated to Liga Artzit. It was also the first season that the Three points for a win system was introduced.

Final table

Results

References
Israel - List of final tables RSSSF

Liga Leumit seasons
Israel
1